Chaman Lal (born 27 August 1947 in Rampura Phul, Bathinda district Punjab) retired as a professor in Hindi translation from Jawaharlal Nehru University. He is now Honorary advisor to Bhagat Singh Archives and Resource Centre, Delhi Archives of Delhi Govt.cn date=March 2021

Books
 The Bhagat Singh Reader 
 Understanding Bhagat Singh	 
Bhagat Singh's jail notebook	 
Bhagatasiṃha sampūrṇa dastāveja
Bhagat Singh-Hindi
Bhagat Singh key rajneetik dastavez
Bhagat Singh Sampuran Lekhan-Hindi-four volumes
Krantiveer Bhagat Singh:Abhyuodey aur Bhavishya
Bhagat Singh:Vicharan Inqlabi-Panjabi
Inqlabi Itihas de Sunehre Panne
Ghadar pary nayak:Kartar Singh Sarabha	 
Bhāratīya sāhitya meṃ dalita evaṃ strī-lekhana (Dalit & women writing in Indian literature)	 
Dalita aura aśveta sāhitya kucha vicāra	 
Hindī patrakāritā vividha āyāma
Yashpal ke Upanyason men raajnitik chetna
Pratinidhi Hindi Upanyas
Sahitya Sanskriti ka pragatisheel samajshashtriya avlokan
Dalit Sahitya ek mulyankan
Guru Ravidas:Dalit Sahitya ke Agardoot
Kavita ke Manviya Sarokar
Jagdish Chander:Dalit Jivan ke Upanyaskar
Pash:Beech ka rasta nahin gota
Pash:Samay O' Bhai Samay
Pash:Vartman ke Rubru
Pash:Sampuran Kavitayen
Pash:Storm never know Defeat
Surjit Patar:An̐dhere meṃ sulagatī varṇamālā	
Surjit Patar:Kabhi Nahin Socha Tha
Lu Xun:Kala, Sahit ate Sabhiachar
Waryam Sandhu:Shreshath kahanian
Swarajbeer:Dharamguru
Mary Tylor:BhARTI jailan vich panj vareh
Prasangvas
Shahkar Sahit ate Sahitkar
Punjabi and Dalit Images in Indian Literature

Awards
Lal won the Sahitya Akademi Award in 2002 but returned the award in protest in 2016.

References 

20th-century Indian novelists
Punjabi-language writers
Punjabi people
People from Bathinda district
Novelists from Punjab, India
1947 births
Living people
Recipients of the Sahitya Akademi Prize for Translation